Jonas Gunnarsson (born 1980) is a Swedish politician and former member of the Riksdag, the national legislature. A member of the Social Democratic Party, he represented Värmland County between October 2010 and September 2018.

Gunnarsson is the son of carpenter/musician Mats Gunnarsson and district nurse Inga-Lill Gunnarsson (née Jönsson). He was educated at a folk high school in Axvall. He has worked as a personal assistant/care worker in Hammarö since 2002. He was a member of the municipal council in Hammarö Municipality from 2003 to 2010.

References

1980 births
Living people
Members of the Riksdag 2010–2014
Members of the Riksdag 2014–2018
Members of the Riksdag from the Social Democrats
People from Värmland County